Giuseppe Ballerio (27 June 1909 – 29 December 1999) was an Italian football player. He was born and died in Milan.

Honours
 Serie A champion: 1937/38, 1939/40.
 Coppa Italia winner: 1938/39.

External links

1909 births
1999 deaths
Italian footballers
Serie A players
Serie B players
S.S.D. Varese Calcio players
U.S. Alessandria Calcio 1912 players
S.S.C. Bari players
Inter Milan players
Aurora Pro Patria 1919 players
Association football defenders